The Eolica Varna Wind Farm is a proposed wind power project in Varna, Bulgaria. It will have 30 individual wind turbines with a nominal output of around 2 MW which will deliver up to 60 MW of power, enough to power over 23,940 homes, with a capital investment required of approximately US$120 million.

See also

Plambeck Bulgarian Wind Farm
Kavarna Wind Farm
Murgash Wind Farm

References

Wind farms in Bulgaria
Proposed wind farms in Bulgaria